The Unscrambler X is a commercial software product for multivariate data analysis, used for calibration of multivariate data which is often in the application of analytical data such as near infrared spectroscopy and Raman spectroscopy,  and development of predictive models for use in real-time spectroscopic analysis of materials.  The software was originally developed in 1986 by Harald Martens and later by CAMO Software.

Functionality

The Unscrambler X was an early adaptation of the use of partial least squares (PLS). Other techniques supported include principal component analysis (PCA), 3-way PLS, multivariate curve resolution, design of experiments, supervised classification, unsupervised classification  
and cluster analysis.

The software is used in spectroscopy (IR, NIR, Raman, etc.), chromatography, and process applications in research and non-destructive quality control systems in pharmaceutical manufacturing, sensory analysis and the chemical industry.

References

Statistical software
Computational chemistry
Spectroscopy

ca:Quimiometria
de:Chemometrik
et:Kemomeetria
es:Quimiometría
it:Chemiometria
mk:Хемометрија
nl:Chemometrie
ja:計量化学
pl:Chemometria
pt:Quimiometria
su:Kémometrik
fi:Kemometria
sv:Kemometri
zh:化学计量学